Sir Michael John Berridge  (22 October 1938 – 13 February 2020) was a British physiologist and biochemist.

Born and raised in Southern Rhodesia (now Zimbabwe), he was best known for his work on cellular transmembrane signalling, in particular the discovery that inositol trisphosphate acts as a second messenger, linking events at the plasma membrane with the release of Ca2+ within the cell. , he was the Emeritus Babraham Fellow in the Signalling Programme Department of the Babraham Institute, Cambridge, and honorary professor of cell signalling at the University of Cambridge.

Education
Born in Gatooma in Southern Rhodesia, Berridge gained a BSc in zoology and chemistry at the University of Rhodesia and Nyasaland, Salisbury (1960), where his interest in insect physiology was stimulated by Eina Bursell. He came to the UK to study with insect physiologist Sir Vincent Wigglesworth at the Department of Zoology of the University of Cambridge, gaining his PhD on the topic of nitrogen excretion in the African cotton stainer (Dysdercus fasciatus) in 1965.

Career and research
Berridge moved to the USA for his early postdoctoral research positions, which were in the Department of Biology of the University of Virginia, Charlottesville, with Dietrich Bodenstein (1965–66); in the Developmental Biology Center of Case Western Reserve University, Cleveland, with Michael Locke (1966–67); and in the Department of Biology of Case Western Reserve University with Bodil Schmidt-Nielsen (1967–69).

He returned to Cambridge in 1969 to become senior and later principal scientific officer of the Agricultural and Food Research Council Unit of Invertebrate Chemistry and Physiology at the Department of Zoology of the University of Cambridge. He served as senior principal scientific officer of the Unit of Insect Neurophysiology and Pharmacology from 1978 until 1990. He then joined the Laboratory of Molecular Signalling of the Babraham Institute as deputy chief scientist, becoming head of that laboratory in 1994, a position he held until his retirement in 2004, when he was appointed the first Emeritus Babraham Fellow. In 1994, he was appointed honorary professor of cell signalling at the
University of Cambridge. He was a fellow of Trinity College.

Publications

Awards and honours
Berridge was awarded the William Bate Hardy Prize in 1987,
the Albert Lasker Basic Medical Research Award in 1989 and the Royal Medal of the Royal Society in 1991. He received the Wolf Prize in Medicine of 1994/5, jointly with Yasutomi Nishizuka, and the Shaw Prize in Life Science and Medicine in 2005. His many other awards include the Feldberg Prize (1984), King Faisal International Prize for Science (1986), Louis-Jeantet Prize for Medicine (1986), Gairdner Foundation International Award (1988), Ciba-Drew Award in biomedical research (1991), Dr H.P. Heineken Prize for Biochemistry and Biophysics (1994), the Massry Prize from the Keck School of Medicine, University of Southern California in 1996, and the Ernst Schering Prize (1999). He was knighted for services to science in the 1998 New Year Honours.

He was elected a Fellow of the Royal Society (FRS) in 1984 and became one of the founding members of the Academy of Medical Sciences in 1998. In 1991, he was elected Foreign Member of the Belgian Académie royale de Médecine de Belgique. In 1999, he was elected a foreign associate of the US National Academy of Sciences and a Foreign Honorary Member of the American Academy of Arts and Sciences. He was elected to the American Philosophical Society in 2007. He was a member of Academia Europaea and the European Molecular Biology Organization. He was also an honorary fellow of the Society of Biology, Biochemical Society, Society for Experimental Biology, Japanese Biochemical Society and the American Physiological Society.

References

1938 births
2020 deaths
Alumni of Gonville and Caius College, Cambridge
Alumni of the University of London
Alumni of University of London Worldwide
British biochemists
British physiologists
Fellows of the Academy of Medical Sciences (United Kingdom)
Fellows of the American Academy of Arts and Sciences
Fellows of the Royal Society
Fellows of Trinity College, Cambridge
Foreign associates of the National Academy of Sciences
Knights Bachelor
Massry Prize recipients
People from Kadoma, Zimbabwe
Recipients of the Albert Lasker Award for Basic Medical Research
Rhodesian emigrants to the United Kingdom
Rhodesian people of British descent
Royal Medal winners
University of Zimbabwe alumni
White Rhodesian people
Winners of the Heineken Prize
Wolf Prize in Medicine laureates